Oqtay Mammadaga oglu Radjabov (5 April 1941 – 15 December 2022) was an Azerbaijani academic and composer.

Biography
Radjabov was born in Baku on 5 April 1941. He earned a degree in physics from the Azerbaijan State Pedagogical University and subsequently taught the subject at an evening school. He became a professor of Azerbaijani folk music and an editor for Azerbaijanfilm. He released six collections of children's songs, focusing on the subjects of patriotism, nature, and mathematics.

Radjabov died on 15 December 2022, at the age of 81.

Awards
 (1982)
Honored Teacher of the Azerbaijan SSR (1987)
Taraggi Medal (2006)
Honored Art Worker of Azerbaijan (2019)

Works

Operas
Göyçək Fatma (1992)
Xeyir və Şər (1994)
Sərçəcik (2012)
Atatürk (2016)

Musical comedies
Əlin cibində olsun (2001)
Şeytanın yubileyi

Symphonic pieces
4 saylı Simfoniya (1997)
Simli orkestr üçün 5 saylı Simfoniya (1998)

Books and articles
Musiqi və mənəvi tərbiyə (1995)
Musiqi (1998)
Dahilik fenomeni haqqında nə bilirik? (1999)

References

1941 births
2022 deaths
Azerbaijani composers
Azerbaijani opera composers
Azerbaijani film score composers
Recipients of the Tereggi Medal
Musicians from Baku